Irish Son is the debut solo album by Irish singer Brian McFadden. It was released on 29 November 2004. McFadden signed with Sony Music following his departure from boy band Westlife in 2004. The singer mainly co-wrote the album with English songwriter Guy Chambers, who produced the album along Paul Stacey, Richard Flack, Mark Taylor, and Phil Thornalley.

The album was preceded by the lead single "Real to Me" on 6 September 2004, which peaked at number one in Denmark, Ireland and the United Kingdom. Irish Son was highly successful on the charts in Denmark and Ireland. Elsewhere the album charted within the lower regions of the charts in Austria, Finland, Netherlands, New Zealand, Sweden, Switzerland and the United Kingdom.

Track listing

Personnel
Adapted from the Irish Son booklet.

 Mark Taylor – mixing (tracks 5, 10 11)
 Ren Swan – mixing (tracks 5, 10, 11)
 Nicole Nodland – front cover portrait
 Halfnight Productions, Art + Commerce – inside portraits

Charts

Certifications

References

External links 
 Born in the heart of Dublin - The Irish Son album fanlisting
SonyBMG "Ireland's Fave Son, Brian McFadden, Heads For Oz!"
 Richard Flack Sound Production

2004 debut albums
Brian McFadden albums
Sony Music Ireland albums